Arisarum is a genus of flowering plants in the family Araceae.  It is native to the Mediterranean region, east to the Caucasus and west to Macaronesia.

Taxonomy

Species
Accepted species:

Natural Hybrids
 Arisarum × aspergillum Dunal - Spain, Algeria, Morocco   (A. simorrhinum × A. vulgare)

Phylogeny
It is closely related to the genera Ambrosina, Peltandra, and Typhonodorum. Ambrosina is the sister group to Arisarum, from which it separated about 46.1 Million years ago.

The precise relationships are displayed in the following cladogram:

Description
In A. simorrhinum, the flower stalk is shorter or equal in length to the leaf stalk, whereas in A. vulgare, the flower stalk is longer than the leaf stalk. A. vulgare also has a generally longer spadix than A. simorrhinum.

Ecology

Parasite ecology

Arisarum foliage is parasitized by the siphonous green algae Phyllosiphon arisari Kühn. It induces necrosis in leaf tissue, after invading the intracellular space. The foliage also may be affected by two species of fungi, namely Phyllosticta arisari and Melanustilospora arisari. The scale insect Icerya purchasi also feeds on Arisarum.

References

External links

Aroideae
Araceae genera
Taxa named by Philip Miller